KKJC-LP (93.5 FM) is a radio station broadcasting a Religious Talk format licensed to McMinnville, Oregon, United States.  The station is currently owned by Calvary Chapel of Mcminnville, Inc.

On 2 July 2009, KKJC was granted Special Temporary Authority to change its frequency to 93.5 MHz. 
 
At 12:15 P.M. on 17 Nov 2009, KKJC commenced operations on 93.5 MHz.

References

External links

 

McMinnville, Oregon
KJC-LP
2009 establishments in Oregon
KJC-LP